The Prague Bandurist Capella was a musical ensemble formed in 1924 by Ukrainians living in Czechoslovakia featuring performers on the bandura.

After the occupation of Ukraine by the Bolsheviks, many Ukrainians moved to the West. In Prague they established a cultural and intellectual centre.

Vasyl Yemetz also moved to the West, initially to Berlin and later to Prague. In Prague he established a number of bandura schools in Prague and Podebrady in 1923-25.

Over 100 banduras were made in Podebrady by Romanenko and Dovzhenko. The school had over 50 students.

In time, from the better students a second Bandurist Capella was established in 1924. Among the members were Mykhailo Teliha and future Ukrainian President in exile Mykola Levytsky. The capella was made up of 15 or 16 bandurists and gave numerous concerts in Prague and its environs.

Reviews of the Capella's performances were published in music magazines in Ukraine, often quite negative regarding its repertoire. In general, the reviewers described the repertoire as too folky and village-oriented. Still, these reviews did stimulate the formation and government support of the bandurist capella movement in Ukraine.

Repertoire

The Soviet Ukrainian magazine "Muzyka" #2, 1925 gave a review of the first concert of the Prague Bandurist Capella which took place 13 September 1924 and included the program:

I 
Kobza and the kobzars - speech by V. Yemetz 
      
II 
Nema v sviti pravdy - kant - Capella 
Kynu kuzhil' na polyciu - Capella 
Plyve sonce nad Orelliu - I. Khvorostenko 
Zasvystaly kozachen'ky - M. Zhyrkov 
Zalizniak - M. Teliha 
      
III 
Oj na hori vohonq horyt' - R. Zavors'kyj 
Oj Moroze, Morozen'ku - Capella 
Oj shchoh to za shum uchynyvsia - Capella 
Hopak - Capella 
Oj, za hayem, hayem - Capella 
      
All the orchestrations were done by V. Yemetz.

In 1926 a book of 12 pieces for the bandura was published in Prague.

Participants
Members of the Capella and students of the school included: 
A. Biletskyj
Petro Buhayiv (Mykola Burhaj)
Nina Burtakova 
Hryhoryj Dovzhenko - bandura maker that Yemetz knew from Moscow.
Oleksander Dutka (and daughter) - moved to Chernivtsi where he continued to make banduras.
Vasyl' Harmiga (Farmiga?)
Maria Hasiuk
Il'ko Havryliuk
Mykola Hudzij 
Rostyslav Kaplynskyj 
I. Khvorostenko
H. Khomenko
Yukhym Klevchutskyj - originally from Central Ukraine, later moved to Ternopil where he taught Zinoviy Shtokalko.
Pan'ko Konoushynsky 
Stepan Koshchyk
Petro Koshchyk 
Yevhen Koshchyk 
Kulish
Andriy Kyst' - later moved to the USA, performed with Avramenko.
Mykola Levytsky - Later moved to France.
Liashenko
Lisevych - Originally from Central Ukraine. Moved to Lviv and taught bandura there.
Ivan Lokshynsky
K. Mohyla - a student of medicine, later director of the Prague capella after Yemetz
Petro Nepokypnyj - Bandura maker. Later lived in Bratislava.
Vasyl' Oblomskyj
M. Omelchenko - taught bandura in Prague. Studied piano in Vienna.
I. Romanenko - bandura maker in Podiebradakh
Rostyslav Pazanivskyj - moved to Canada - St Catherines.
Maria Shostak - originally from Kuban. Later moved to Lviv and taught bandura there.
Volodymyr Shmorhun
Volodymyr Shul' 
K. Stetsiurenko 
Dmytro Stopkevych 
A. Syvokin'
Serhiy Tarulia 
Zavorytskyj, Panas (Zavorskyj R. - soloist of the capella
Zhyrkov, M. - soloist of the capella
Vsevolod Zmiyenko

Sources 

Yemetz, V. - U zolote 50-richchia na sluzhbi Ukrainy - Toronto, 1961 - p. 75, 79

"Muzyka" #2, 1925
Горлиця. Л. -  Василь Ємець – кобзар віртуоз, композитор // Вісті, ч. 34, 1970.
Ємець, В. У золоте 50 річчя на службі Україні — Голівуд, США, 1961
Ластович-Чулівський, С. Бандура – Рукопис, Мюнхен  1965
Лисько, З. До історії кобзарського мистецтва // Сучасність, 1977 ч. 10
Маруняк, В. (упор) Українська Гімназія в Чехії (1925–45) – Мюнхен, 1975
Мішалов, В. Бандура в еміграційних центрах у міжвоенний період // Karpacki collage artystyczny Biuletyn - Przemysl 2005 s.95-104
ж. Музика #2, 1925 р.
Самчук, У. - Живі струни - Детройт,  США, 1976
Теліга, М. – Наша пісня – Збірник українських народних дум і пісень з проводом бандури – Збірник перший – вид. “Кобзар” Прага, 1926

Kobzarstvo
Bandura ensembles
Ukrainian folk musicians
Czech choirs
Musical groups established in 1924
1924 establishments in Czechoslovakia